The 2010–11 season is Rochdale's 104th year in existence and their first season in League One following promotion from League Two the previous season. Along with competing in League One, the club participated in the FA Cup, Football League Cup and Football League Trophy. The season covers the period from 1 July 2010 to 30 June 2011.

This was the club's first season in the third tier since 1974. An 9th place finish was their highest league finish since 1970.

League table

Statistics
																								
																								

|}

Results

Pre-season Friendlies

League One

FA Cup

League Cup

EFL Trophy

References

Rochdale A.F.C. seasons
Roch